The West Virginia Mountaineers are the intercollegiate women's soccer team representing West Virginia University. The Mountaineers compete in Division I of the National Collegiate Athletics Association (NCAA) as members of the Big 12 Conference. The first team was fielded in 1996. WVU plays its home games at Dick Dlesk Soccer Stadium in Morgantown, West Virginia.

The women's soccer team at WVU has been coached by Nikki Izzo-Brown since the team launched in 1996.

West Virginia has qualified for the NCAA Tournament each of the last 16 seasons, making the quarterfinal round twice (2007 and 2015).

Big 12 Conference (2012–present)
Since joining the Big 12 Conference, West Virginia women's soccer has won five straight outright regular-season championships, becoming the first program in league history to do so. The Mountaineers are also the first team in the Big 12 to finish three seasons with an unbeaten league record. In 2016, the Mountaineers became the second program in Big 12 history to finish league play with an unbeaten and untied league record (Nebraska accomplished that feat twice, finishing 9–0–0 in 1996 and 10–0–0 in 1999).

WVU has posted a 35–1–3 record in regular-season league contests. The Mountaineers are 18–0–1 at home against Big 12 foes and have not lost a league game there since October 2, 2009 vs. Notre Dame. West Virginia has a 6–2–1 record in the Big 12 tournament, winning back-to-back championships in 2013 and 2014.

The Mountaineers' five regular-season league titles ranks first among current Big 12 members and second all-time in the conference's history (Texas A&M had 7). West Virginia's eight combined (regular-season and tournament) championships is also first among current Big 12 members and tied for second best in Big 12 history (Texas A&M had 12 and Nebraska had 8).

2015 season

2015 was a record-setting year for West Virginia women's soccer. Aided by Canadian national team stars Kadeisha Buchanan and Ashley Lawrence, the Mountaineers set school records for wins (19), goals scored (61), fewest goals allowed (11) and shutouts (15). WVU put together a streak of nine straight shutouts, the longest streak in the nation in 2015. That run also tied the Big 12 record for consecutive shutouts (Nebraska posted nine straight shutouts during the 1997 season).

WVU started the 2015 season by extending its program-best unbeaten streak to 20 games. The Mountaineers would restart that run following an early season loss to Virginia Tech, winning or drawing each of the next 16 games.

2016 season

In 2016, the Mountaineers continued to run through the competition. West Virginia posted an 8–1–1 record in non-conference play, opening the year with a 1–1 tie at defending national champion Penn State. The non-conference slate also included a 3–1 road win at Duke, the program's first victory over the Blue Devils.

WVU's hot start continued into league play, where the Mountaineers won all eight of their conference matchups via shutouts, becoming the first team in Big 12 history to shutout all of its league opponents. West Virginia claimed a fifth straight Big 12 championship with a 3–0 win at TCU on October 21, 2016. WVU currently owns a 22-game unbeaten streak in regular-season league games, the longest streak in the history of the conference.

Schedule

Season-by-season results

References

External links